The ITF Women's Circuit is the second-tier tour for women's professional tennis organised by the International Tennis Federation, and is a tier below the WTA Tour. The ITF Women's Circuit includes tournaments with prize money ranging from $10,000 up to $100,000.

The ITF world champions in 2008 were Jelena Janković (senior singles), Cara Black / Liezel Huber (senior doubles) and Noppawan Lertcheewakarn (combined junior ranking).

Tournament breakdown by event category

Tournament breakdown by region

Singles titles by nation

This list displays only the top 21 nations in terms of singles titles wins.

See also
2008 ITF Women's Circuit (January–March)
2008 ITF Women's Circuit (April–June)
2008 ITF Women's Circuit (July–September)

Sources
List of ITF World Champions 
2008 ITF statistics summary
ITF pro circuit titles won by nations players in 2008

References

External links
International Tennis Federation (ITF) official website

 
ITF Women's Circuit
ITF Women's World Tennis Tour
2008 in women's tennis